Jamaica competed in the 2015 Parapan American Games.

Competitors
The following table lists Jamaica's delegation per sport and gender.

Medalists
The following competitors from Jamaica won medals at the games. In the by discipline sections below, medalists' names are bolded.

|  style="text-align:left; width:78%; vertical-align:top;"|

|  style="text-align:left; width:22%; vertical-align:top;"|

Athletics

Men
Track

Field

Women
Field

References

2015 in Jamaican sport
Nations at the 2015 Parapan American Games
Jamaica at the Pan American Games